Prince Wilhelm, Duke of Södermanland (Carl Wilhelm Ludvig; 17 June 1884 – 5 June 1965) was a Swedish and Norwegian prince. He authored many books (primarily in Swedish) as Prins Wilhelm.

Personal life

Wilhelm was born at Tullgarn Palace, the second son of King Gustaf V of Sweden and his wife Victoria of Baden.

Marriage and divorce
On 3 May 1908, in Tsarskoye Selo, Wilhelm married Grand Duchess Maria Pavlovna of Russia, a daughter of Grand Duke Paul Alexandrovich of Russia by his first wife Princess Alexandra of Greece and Denmark. The bride was a cousin of the reigning Russian tsar, Nicholas II. The couple had one son: Lennart (1909–2004).

The marriage was unhappy. Their son, Lennart, later wrote an autobiography in which he revealed several details of the Swedish royal family. The autobiography tells of how Maria, like her aunt and namesake Grand Duchess Maria Alexandrovna, Duchess of Saxe-Coburg and Gotha, felt that she had married beneath herself in marrying a younger son of the King of Sweden, and this caused problems of ego between the couple. Maria insisted that the servants address her by her correct style Your Imperial and Royal Highness, to the chagrin of her husband, who was merely a Royal Highness. When apprised of the matter, Wilhelm's father King Gustav V had no choice but to acquiesce with his daughter-in-law's wish, which was perfectly valid in law, and ordered that the imperial style be used invariably for Maria. 

Maria sought a divorce because of what she described as the horror she then felt toward the Swedish royal family, due to their unlimited support of their official physician,  Axel Munthe, who had accosted her sexually. The divorce was granted in 1914, and Maria returned to Russia.

Later life
Wilhelm had a relationship, which was not publicly known, with Jeanne de Tramcourt which lasted from around 1914 (starting date unknown) until Jeanne's death in 1952. They lived together for more than 30 years on the estate Stenhammar near Flen. This was at a time when cohabitation was very unusual and not officially allowed to occur among royalty. Jeanne de Tramcourt was therefore called his "hostess" at Stenhammar. On 2 January 1952 she died in a car accident in a snowstorm near Stjärnhov in Södermanland, when they were on their way to Stenhammar after visiting Wilhelm's son Lennart. Wilhelm was driving when the accident took place. After this tragedy, he is said never to have recovered.

Career and interests
Wilhelm was a noted photographer and the author of several books written in Swedish under the pen name Prins Wilhelm.

In keeping with protocol demanded of royalty in modern democracies, Wilhelm kept studiously away from politics. One of his rare forays into the political sphere happened during the Second World War, following the murder of the Danish playwright and Lutheran pastor Kaj Munk on 4 January 1944. It was alleged, perhaps correctly, that the occupying German forces (specifically the Gestapo) were behind the murder, and the Danish resistance newspaper De frie Danske carried condemnatory reactions from numerous influential Scandinavians. Wilhelm was one of those who condemned the murder.

Death

Wilhelm suffered from emphysema caused by several years of chain smoking and died in his sleep, from a heart attack, in Flen, just 12 days before his 81st birthday.

Honours and awards
He received the following orders and decorations:

National honours
 Knight and Commander of the Seraphim, 17 June 1884
 Knight of the Order of Charles XIII, 17 June 1884
 Commander Grand Cross of the Sword, 17 June 1884
 Commander Grand Cross of the Polar Star, 17 June 1884
 Commander Grand Cross of the Order of Vasa, 16 June 1948
 King Oscar II and Queen Sofia's Golden Wedding Medal
 King Oscar II's Jubilee Commemorative Medal
 Crown Prince Gustaf V and Crown Princess Silver Wedding Medal
 King Gustaf V's Jubilee Commemorative Medal (1928)
 King Gustaf V's Jubilee Commemorative Medal (1948)

Foreign honours

Arms

Ancestors

References

External links

Wilhelm, Prince of Sweden and Norway, Duke of Södermanland
Wilhelm, Prince of Sweden and Norway, Duke of Södermanland
Wilhelm, Prince of Sweden and Norway, Duke of Södermanland
Wilhelm 1884
Knights of the Order of Charles XIII
Commanders Grand Cross of the Order of the Sword
Commanders Grand Cross of the Order of the Polar Star
Grand Crosses of the Order of Vasa
Knights of the Order of the Norwegian Lion
Recipients of the King Haakon VII Freedom Cross
Honorary Knights Grand Cross of the Royal Victorian Order
Recipients of the Order of the Netherlands Lion
Grand Crosses of the Order of Saint-Charles
Dukes of Södermanland
Sons of kings
Swedish Navy rear admirals
Swedish Army major generals
Recipients of orders, decorations, and medals of Ethiopia